Soledad is a novel by Angie Cruz, published in 2001.

Introduction 
Soledad outlines a story about a girl (Soledad) who could not get away from her contentious family fast enough despite the petty fights and the endless tragedies that they experienced. At some point, Soledad found her way out and enrolled for an art course at Cooper Union. However, after finding her way out, Soledad returns to Washington Heights’ neighborhood after mother, Olivia, mysteriously becomes ill. Evidently, Olivia is in a state where she is considered a “living ghost” . It appears that she is in an emotional coma and the return of Soledad is regarded as the only cure. After her return to 164th street, Soledad tries to tame her cousin Flaca’s unruly behavior and resists falling for a neighborhood boy, Ritche, besides dealing with the greatest challenge she was facing at the time. Evidently, Soledad was confronting the daunting memory she had with her mother in the past as well as salvaging their broken relationship

Also, during her return, Soledad is forced to confront her family to understand the secrets behind the death of her father. A significant section of the novel is provided from the perspective of Soledad’s female relatives, Flaca and Gorda. Flaca is constantly in rivalry with Soledad. Gorda is Soledad’s aunt, who is also known as a witch (bruja), who treats her sister’s ailments with ceremonies and home remedies. The story is also unveiled from Olivia’s point of view through the use of flashbacks and italicized dream narration. The three characters are more interesting in comparison to Soledad. Evidently, when Cruz outlines fresh details of rhythms and behavior of Dominican community life, the three are rarely left out. Soledad is an important literary piece which presents a story of chaos and culture, integrity with family and mysticism while examining the concepts from the perspective of a Latina.

References

External links 
 Cruz, Angie. Soledad. Chicago: Simon & Schuster, 2001.
 Masiki, Trent. "Soledad." Black Issues Book Review, Sept. 2001, p. 13. Gale General OneFile, . Accessed 29 Nov. 2019.
 "Soledad." Americas, Mar.-Apr. 2006, p. 62. Gale General OneFile, . Accessed 29 Nov. 2019.

2001 novels